The 1997–98 season is the second in the history of the Glasgow Warriors as a professional side. During this season the young professional side competed as Glasgow Rugby.

This season saw Glasgow Rugby compete in the competitions: the Scottish Inter-District Championship and the European Champions Cup, the Heineken Cup.

Season Overview

Disquiet grows

Notwithstanding the 'Gang of Four' pressing for the club teams to be used in Europe instead of the district teams, further disquiet was building against Kevin Greene's dual role as Glasgow Hawks coach and Glasgow Warriors coach. The matter was brought to a head when Greene signed Tommy Hayes for the Glasgow side and Kilmarnock RFC complained that they had not been given an opportunity to bid for the player; as one club team in the district would be assigned the player when not in use by the professional Glasgow side.

Hayes was later assigned the Glasgow Hawks club; Greene's club side.

European highs and lows

Getting out of the Heineken Cup pool stage was extremely positive for the Glasgow side. However the manner of the defeat in the play-off for the Quarter finals by Leicester Tigers brought further grist to the mill as far as the 'Gang of Four' were concerned. Such was the ease of the win by Leicester that one of their players Dean Richards went off-pitch for a toilet break in the middle of the match without the Tigers replacing him.

The result though probably wasn't helped by the prior announcement that the Leicester Tigers match would be Greene's last in charge of Glasgow. To the SRU this season's European results showed that their current model of professionalism wasn't working and they resolved to change the structure of the newly professional game in Scotland. The effects of this resolve were to be seen in the following season.

Ulster interest in Greene

Ulster Rugby made overtures to Kevin Greene about being their new Director of Rugby, straight after Glasgow's defeat of Ulster in the Challenge Cup. Greene however turned them down, preferring to go home to his native New Zealand. He had already agreed with Jim Telfer that he would act as an 'agent' for Glasgow Warriors and Scotland in New Zealand by helping out the training of the Silver Thistles. Glasgow later used Greene on the same basis for their 'academy side': the Glasgow Thistles.

"The job description from Ulster landed on my desk this week after they spoke to me at Scotstoun when the game was over. They said they needed a new direction," said Greene. "I am flattered, but I won't be taking up the position. I spoke to Jim Telfer this week and agreed that I will stay in Scotland to see Glasgow's game with Leicester through, and then go back to New Zealand.

"We are keen that the Silver Thistles tourists carry on, and we are to investigate the possibility of taking coaches over there as well to learn what they do. I suppose, to some extent, I will be an agent for Scotland back home."

New coach

Another New Zealander was brought in to coach Glasgow Rugby. Keith Robertson was ear-marked by the SRU's Jim Telfer earlier in the year as a potential candidate for Glasgow when Robertson's Otago Highlanders team toured the UK. He took over Glasgow in November 1997.

Strength and Fitness and the Elite Development Programme

David Jordan, the chief executive of GDRU, acknowledges: "The result against Leicester told us that we have still much to do. We were found wanting in a number of departments, particularly our overall fitness and strength. It is vital that we recognise where out weaknesses are."

Glasgow issued an Action Plan on how it planned to resolve those weaknesses. It stated: "The Glasgow and District Rugby Union will be aggressively looking beyond Scotland to identify players to enhance and improve the performance of the team. Priority will be given to identifying players with Scottish eligibility. The district will also take full advantage of the use of two non-EU international players."

"The GDRU will utilise the services of a weight training specialist. Every squad member will be given one-to-one training and will work to individually tailored programmes."

In other areas of physical conditioning the plan envisages that there will be a player appraisal programme. "It will be based on setting individual training, fitness and dietary targets. Players will be expected to do training outwith normal squad sessions and be responsible for achieving the targets set," says the action plan.

Glasgow's initial squad of players for next season will be selected next month and between then and March will be the start of what the plan calls the Elite Development Programme that will concentrate on the players who "have the physical and mental ability to represent Glasgow and the Scottish Rugby Union."

"This is the key to the long-term success of Scottish rugby," says the action plan which makes it clear that better identification of talent and an increase in playing numbers are priorities in the next few years.

Team

Coaches

Head coach:  Kevin Greene to November 1997;  Keith Robertson from November 1997
Assistant coach:  Gordon Macpherson from November 1997
Fitness coach:   Ken MacEwen
Physiotherapists:  Sarah Mitchell and  Alan Mackay

Staff

Chairman: Ken Crichton
Vice-Chairman: George Blackie
Convenor / Team Manager:  Hamish Fyfe
Chief Executive: David Jordan
Administrative Executive: Bill McMurtrie
Committee: Gordon Ash, Norry Boyle, Ewan Cameron, John Dyer, Alasdair Graham, Tom Morrice,Bill Nolan, Willie Talbot (SRU Championship Committee Representative),Dick Thomas (West of Scotland rugby Referees Society Representative)
Secretary: Victoria Mount

Squad

Academy players

A 22 strong group of age-grade Glasgow District players – known as the Glasgow Thistles – were sent to New Zealand for rugby training under the aegis of Kevin Greene in February 1998.

The 22 Glasgow Thistles: Gillon Armstrong (Kilmarnock), Colin Bartwicki (East Kilbride), Stuart Bryce (Glasgow Southern), Stuart Caulfield (Dalziel), Scott Chassels (Glasgow Academy), Rory Couper (Ardrossan Academicals), Hugh Fulton (Glasgow Academy), Craig Hamilton (Wigtownshire), Rory Kerr (Strathendrick), Douglas Lyall (Hutchesons' GS), Richard Maxton (Stewart's Melville FP), Andrew McGeoch (Glasgow Academy), Ian McInroy (Garnock), Eric Milligan (Stewarton Academy and Kilmarnock), Iain Monaghan (Glasgow Southern), Craig Murdoch (Ayr), Euan Murray (Williamwood HS and Glasgow Southern), Chris Pothan (Kelvinside Academy), Colin Stewart (East Kilbride), Gordon Tyler (Ardrossan Academicals), Jan Vos (Glasgow Southern), Martin Yorston (Lenzie).

Player statistics
During the 1997–98 season, Glasgow have used 29 different players in competitive games. The table below shows the number of appearances and points scored by each player.

Staff movements

Coaches

Personnel In

 Keith Robertson from  Highlanders
 Gordon Macpherson from  West of Scotland

Personnel Out

 Kevin Greene returned to New Zealand

Player movements

Academy promotions

None

Player transfers

In

 Gavin Fraser from  London Irish
 Tommy Hayes from  Waikato

 Matt McGrandles from  Glasgow Hawks
 David Jamieson from  West of Scotland
 Danny Ablett from  Glasgow Hawks
 Aaron Collins from  West of Scotland
 Gerry Hawkes from  Glasgow Hawks
 Gary Isaac from  Kilmarnock RFC
 Erin Cossey from  Glasgow Southern RFC
 Chris Simmers from  Edinburgh Rugby
 Scott Hutton from  Glasgow Hawks
 Andrew Ness from  Glasgow Hawks

Out

 Calum MacGregor retired  
 Kenny Logan to  London Wasps
 George Breckenridge to  Glasgow Hawks
 Harry Bassi to  Glasgow Hawks
 Kenny Baillie to  Glasgow Hawks
 Andrew Garry to  Watsonians RFC
 James McLaren to  Caledonia Reds
 David McVey to  West of Scotland
 Brian Robertson to  Stirling County
 John MacLeod to  Glasgow Hawks

Competitions

Pre-season and friendlies

Match 1

Glasgow – C Sangster (Stirling County); D Stark (Glasgow Hawks), A Bulloch (West of Scotland), C Simmers (Glasgow Hawks), J Craig (West of Scotland); C Little (Glasgow Hawks), F Stott (West of Scotland); G Isaac (Kilmarnock Falcons), G Bulloch (West of Scotland) captain, G McIlwham (Glasgow Hawks), S Begley (Glasgow Hawks), G Perrett (West of Scotland), F Wallace (Glasgow Hawks), D McLeish (West of Scotland), G Mackay (Glasgow Hawks). Replacements – J Weston (Watsonians) for Stott, M Norval (Stirling County) for Begley, G Metcalfe (Glasgow Hawks) for Stark, J McLaren (Stirling County) for A Bulloch, all 40 mins, A Perrie (Glasgow Hawks) for Isaac, A Ness (Glasgow Hawks) for Mackay, E Cossey (Glasgow Southern) for Little.

London Scottish – D Lee; K Milligan, R Davies, R Eriksson, G Thompson; J Cameron, S Cook; P Johnston, J Allan, P Burnell, E Jones, R Hunter, C Tarbuck, M Watson, S Holmes. Replacements – C Smith for Thompson (50 mins), C Morley for Cook (59), T Jankovich for Tarbuck (67), I McAusland for Cameron (68).

Match 2

Sale Sharks – J Mallinder (captain); C Yates, J Baxendell, A Hadley, T Beim; S Mannix, R Smith; P Smith, S Diamond, A Smith, C Murphy, D Baldwin, P Sanderson, D Erskine, D O'Grady. Replacements: S Howarth, K Ellis, D Williamson, M Driver, M Kirk, A Morris.

Glasgow – C Sangster; D Stark, A Bulloch, I Jardine, G Metcalfe; C Little, F Stott; G Isaac, G Bulloch (captain), G McIlwham, M Norval, G Perrett, M Wallace, D McLeish, I Sinclair. Replacements: C Docherty, F Wallace, C Simmers, J McLaren, M McGrandles, J Craig, D Ablett, G Mackay, C Afuakwah, A Perrie, J Weston.

Match 3

West Hartlepool – Farrell; Cavey, Botham, Connolly, John; Benson, Nu'ualitia; Sparks, Challenor, Hathaway, Webb, Schrader, Hood, Ponton, Hyde. Replacements – Knowles for Benson, Peacock for Challenor, Jones for Cavey (all at half time).

Glasgow – Sangster; Stark, A Bulloch, Jardine, Craig; Hayes, Weston; McIlwham, G Bulloch, Beckham, Afuakwah, Perrett, M Wallace, McLeish, Sinclair. Replacements – Kittle for Beckham (60min), Simmers for Jardine (61), Stott for Weston (64), Ness for McLeish (72), Metcalfe for Craig (72), Jardine for Hayes (75).

Match 4

Caledonia Reds – Caledonia Reds – Shepherd; Renton, Rouse, Carruthers, Longstaff; Easson, Black; Penman, Scott, Manson, White, Grimes, McIvor, Flockhart, Waite. Substitutes – Fraser for Carruthers (39m), Hayter for Waite (40), Herrington for Penman (40), Officer for Rouse (53), Penman for Manson (75).

Glasgow – Simmers; Stark, Bulloch, McGrandles, Metcalfe; Hayes, Stott; McIlwham, Bulloch, Beckham, Afuakwah, Perrett, F Wallace, McLeish, M Wallace. Shaw for McLeish. Substitutes – Kittle for McIlwham (40), Ablett for A Bulloch (65), Porte for Beckham, Docherty for G Bulloch.

Match 5

Glasgow – Sangster; Fraser (temporary replacement Hawkes), Bulloch, Collins, Metcalfe; Hayes, Stott (Little); McIlwham (Simmers), Docherty, Beckham (Jamieson); Norval, Perrett; F Wallace (Mackay), M Wallace(capt), Shaw (Hutton).

ACT Brumbies – Kafer(capt); Nasalio, Swan, Birch, Todd; McMullen, Cordingley; Zammit, Paul, Moore, Morahan, Harrison, Plenty, Jacques, Fenukitau.

European Champions Cup

The previous year's Scottish Inter-District Championship produced a tight finish and Glasgow were just pipped to first place by Caledonia Reds. The second place achieved in the Scottish Inter-District was enough for Glasgow to be entered in the Heineken Cup for the new season 1997–98.

The pool matches saw Glasgow grouped alongside London Wasps; with former player Kenny Logan now starring for the English side. Logan was to put Glasgow to the sword over the two matches, scoring 3 tries against his old team. Nevertheless, Glasgow did well enough to get out the group and snatch a quarter final play-off place. However they were soundly beaten by the Leicester Tigers and their matches against English opposition showed the gulf of professionalism that then existed between Scotland and England.

In the pool matches teams received 
2 points for a win 
1 points for a draw

Pool 2

Results

Round 1

Round 2

Round 3

Round 4

Round 5

Round 6

Quarter final play-offs

Scottish Inter-District Championship

For 1997–98 season the Scottish Inter-District Championship was sponsored by Inter-City Trains. Hence the Championship became known as the Inter-City and the Cup won became the Inter-City Cup.

1997–98 League Table

Results

Round 1

Round 2

Round 3

Competitive debuts this season

A player's nationality shown is taken from the nationality at the highest honour for the national side obtained; or if never capped internationally their place of birth. Senior caps take precedence over junior caps or place of birth; junior caps take precedence over place of birth. A player's nationality at debut may be different from the nationality shown. Combination sides like the British and Irish Lions or Pacific Islanders are not national sides, or nationalities.

Players in BOLD font have been capped by their senior international XV side as nationality shown.

Players in Italic font have capped either by their international 7s side; or by the international XV 'A' side as nationality shown.

Players in normal font have not been capped at senior level.

A position in parentheses indicates that the player debuted as a substitute. A player may have made a prior debut for Glasgow Warriors in a non-competitive match, 'A' match or 7s match; these matches are not listed.

Tournaments where competitive debut made:

Crosshatching indicates a jointly hosted match.

Sponsorship
 Dundas & Wilson
 Multi Metals Aluminium
 O'Rourke Scotland Ltd.

Official Kit Supplier

Canterbury

References

1997-98
1997–98 in Scottish rugby union
1997–98 Heineken Cup